Bolivian may refer to:

 Something of, or related to Bolivia
 Bolivian people
 Demographics of Bolivia
 Culture of Bolivia
SS Bolivian, a British-built standard cargo ship